Hatoayok Island is an island located within Coronation Gulf, south of Victoria Island, in the Kitikmeot Region, Nunavut, Canada.

Other islands in the vicinity include Anchor Island,Douglas Island, Haodlon Island, Hokagon Island, Ivonayak Island, Kabviukvik Island, Mangak Island, Nanortut Island, and Nanukton Island. The community of Kugkluktuk (formerly Coppermine) is located on the mainland,  to the south.

References

Islands of Coronation Gulf
Uninhabited islands of Kitikmeot Region